Pancho Talero en Hollywood  is a 1931 Argentine film directed by Arturo Lanteri and starring Pepito Petray.

Synopsis
Pancho Talero's daughter wins a trip to Hollywood as a prize in a beauty contest.

Production
Pancho Talero en Hollywood was one of a series of films featuring Don Pancho Talero, a character created by cartoonist Arturo Lanteri. Both of these had been silent films, but with Pancho Talero en Hollywood, director Arturo Lanteri moved into sound film. The film was produced at the Sociedad Impresora de Discos Electrofónicos (S.I.D.E.) Studios.

References

External links
 

Argentine comedy films
1931 films
1930s Spanish-language films
Films based on Argentine comics
Live-action films based on comics
Hollywood, Los Angeles in fiction
Argentine black-and-white films
1931 comedy films
Films set in Los Angeles
1930s Argentine films